The Potsdamer Neueste Nachrichten (also known as the PNN) is a regional, daily newspaper published by the Dieter von Holtzbrinck Medien GmbH for the area in and around the state capital of Brandenburg, Potsdam in Germany.

History 

The newspaper was created in 1951 under the name of Brandenburgische Neueste Nachrichten as the party organ of the Eastern German National Democratic Party of Germany.

External links

References 

Mass media in Potsdam
Daily newspapers published in Germany
German-language newspapers
Publications established in 1951